These are the official results of the Women's 20 km walk event at the 2002 European Championships in Munich, Germany, held on August 7, 2002. The women's 20 km walk event replaced the 10 km walk, which was run since the 1986 edition of the European Championships.

Medalists

Abbreviations
All times shown are in hours:minutes:seconds

Records

Final

See also
 1999 Women's World Championships 20km Walk (Seville)
 2000 Women's Olympic 20km Walk (Sydney)
 2001 Women's World Championships 20km Walk (Edmonton)
 2002 Race Walking Year Ranking
 2003 Women's World Championships 20km Walk (Paris)
 2004 Women's Olympic 20km Walk (Athens)
 2005 Women's World Championships 20km Walk (Helsinki)

References
 Results
 Official Results

Walk 20 km
Racewalking at the European Athletics Championships
2002 in women's athletics